The International Women Democrat Union, abbreviated to IWDU, is the women's wing of the International Democrat Union, the political international for centre-right political parties.

External links
 International Women's Democrat Union page on the IDU website

International Democrat Union
Women's wings of political parties
Organizations established in 1982
Right-wing politics